Orange County Sheriff's Department may refer to:

Orange County Sheriff's Department (California)
 Orange County Sheriff's Office (Florida)

See also 
Orange County Sheriff's Office (disambiguation)